William Watts Ball (December 9, 1868 — October 14, 1952) was a newspaper editor, journalism dean, columnist, and author in South Carolina. He was noted for his Conservatism. The Duke University Library has a collection of his papers.

He was born in Laurens, South Carolina.

The Editor and the Republic is a collection of his speeches and articles published by UNC Press. John D. Stark wrote his thesis about him in 1961.

Bibliography
The state that forgot; South Carolina's surrender to democracy
Essays in reaction: Back to Calhoun, Back to aristocracy, read before the Kosmos Club of Columbia, S.C
A boy's recollections of the Red Shirt campaign of 1876 in South Carolina
An episode in South Carolina politics
Call it by its name
The freedom of the press in South Carolina and its limitations
A view of the state. Response to the sentiment "The day we celebrate" at the 184th Anniversary dinner of the St. Andrew's Society of Charleston, S.C

References

People from Laurens, South Carolina
Editors of South Carolina newspapers

1868 births
1952 deaths